Jamia Osmania railway station is a railway station in Hyderabad, Telangana, India. Localities like Barkatpura and Ramnagar are accessible from this station.

Lines
Hyderabad Multi-Modal Transport System
Falaknuma–Secunderabad route (FS Line)

External links
MMTS Timings as per South Central Railway

MMTS stations in Hyderabad
Hyderabad railway division